is a 2014 Japanese anime series produced by Sunrise, and later by its subsidiary, BN Pictures. The series, directed by Masaya Fujimori, aired on TV Asahi between September 28, 2014 and October 4, 2015. The series is licensed in North America by Sentai Filmworks.

Plot
One day, Haneru Tobitatsu, a middle school student who loves to dance, meets Kanon Otosaki, a girl who is also skilled at dancing, but is shy about doing it in public. As the two get to know each other, they team up with three other dancers; Kumo, Mizuki, and Yuzuru, to form the dance group Tribe Cool Crew.

Characters

Tribe Cool Crew
Cool Crew

An energetic young boy who makes up for his short stature with incredible jumping ability. He has a strong love for dancing, wanting to be just like his idol, Jay-El. He initially forms the Cool Crew unit with Kanon before merging with Tribal Soul to become Tribe Cool Crew.

A very shy girl who attends a private girls' academy. Prior to meeting Haneru, she posts anonymous dance videos online under the persona of "Rhythm", but soon starts to break out of her shell after meeting Haneru.

The leader of the Tribal Soul dance crew alongside Mizuki and Yuzuru, who specializes in breakdancing. Despite his fearsome appearance, he is quite kind. He tends to call out to and challenge those who interest him.

Tribal Soul's second member, a kind-hearted woman who specializes in jazz and has a love of sweets as well as a relaxed personality.

A slightly portly but very gentlemanly member of Tribal Soul, who often serves as the MC for the group. He is described as a "dance machine", skilled in all kinds of dance.

Blossom Bullets

Other dance groups

Dance Road

A world famous dancer whose dance moves bring inspiration to many.

A mysterious man who is often seen wearing various disguises and performing moonwalks}.Sometimes  seen observing talented dancers.

Jey El's butler.

The MC of the Dance Road tournament.

Other characters

Haneru's father.

Haneru's mother.

A security guard at the Memorial Hall where Haneru and Kanon originally practise.

Kanon's best friend and classmate.

Media

Anime

The series, produced by Sunrise and later BN Pictures, aired on TV Asahi in Japan between September 28, 2014 and October 4, 2015 and was simulcast by Crunchyroll. The series is directed by Masaya Fujimori and written by Atsuhiro Tomioka, with character design by Yoshiaki Yanagida and music production by Avex Proworks and A-bee. The opening theme is "Heartbeat" performed by Lol. The series is licensed in North America by Sentai Filmworks.  Like a few anime television series that are broadcast on TV Asahi.  The anime incorporates all the credits into the opening theme and there is no ending theme or ending for the show.  A first for Sunrise's anime television series since it aired on TV Asahi.

Video game
A video game by Bandai Namco Entertainment, titled , was released on May 28, 2015 for the Nintendo 3DS.

References

External links
Official website 

2014 anime television series debuts
Anime with original screenplays
Bandai Namco franchises
Bandai Namco Pictures
Music in anime and manga
Sentai Filmworks
Sunrise (company)